Eugenio Isabelo Tomas Reyes Sanchez Jr. (born July 11, 1966), or widely known as Bo Sanchez, is a Filipino author, entrepreneur, Catholic lay preacher, motivational speaker and minister. He is known as the "Preacher in Blue Jeans" and the founder of Light of Jesus Family and The Feast.

Early life
Bo Sanchez was born as Eugenio Isabelo Tomas Reyes Sanchez Jr. on July 11, 1966 in Caloocan to Eugenio Sr. and Pilar Sanchez. 

He was often brought to prayer meetings by his parents. His parents first started attending prayer meetings in 1978 by the Upper Room Prayer Group in Project 7, Quezon City. The Sanchezes would later found their own prayer group, the Light of Jesus in their residence in Cubao, Quezon City. The first prayer meeting by the Light of Jesus was led by Eugenio Sanchez Sr. on September 9, 1980.

Ministerial career
On September 16, 1989 during the second prayer meeting of the Light of Jesus, the 13-year-old Bo Sanchez gave his first talk. He has not stopped preaching since. In 1996, he also founded the Anawim, a facility for taking care of abandoned elderly people in Rizal.

His work as a lay preacher has brought him all over the world. Bo has received many recognitions and awards in the Philippines and the Church. These include winning the Ten Outstanding Young Men award in 2006

He is the founder of one of the religious communities in the Philippines, the Light of Jesus Family. The community, as of 2016, has 35,000 members in the Philippines and the rest of the world Through this, he founded two gatherings, the annual inspirational convention Kerygma Conference (now rebranded as Feast Conference, founded in 2006) and the weekly fellowship and worship called "The Feast" in 200 areas in the country and other parts of the world. He also founded the Truly Rich Club, an online private membership group where subscribers are provided with financial advice on how to invest in the stock market.

He also hosted a daily radio program on Radio Veritas and Kape at Salita on DZMM and TeleRadyo from 2018 to 2021.

Personal life
Bo Sanchez is married to Marowe Sanchez with whom he has two sons.

Filmography
Television

References

External links
Official Site

1966 births
Living people
Filipino television evangelists
Christian writers
Filipino Roman Catholics
Filipino radio personalities
People from Caloocan
People from Quezon City
Businesspeople from Metro Manila
Writers from Metro Manila
Filipino motivational speakers